Chlamydastis habrolepis is a moth in the family Depressariidae. It was described by André Blanchard and Edward C. Knudson in 1986. It is found in North America, where it has been recorded from southern Texas.

References

Moths described in 1986
Chlamydastis